Aromobates haydeeae (common name: El Vivero rocket frog) is a species of frog in the family Aromobatidae. It is endemic to Mérida and Táchira states in western Venezuela.
Its natural habitats are clear, fast-flowing streams in Andean cloud forest and the puddles alongside the streams. They may sometimes hide inside introduced Pennisetum clandestinum grasses.  The male protects the eggs that are laid on land. After hatching, the male carries the tadpoles on his back to water where they develop further.

This uncommon species is threatened by habitat loss.

References

haydeeae
Amphibians of Venezuela
Endemic fauna of Venezuela
Taxonomy articles created by Polbot
Amphibians described in 1978